James Campbell  (28 October 1838 – 13 September 1925) was a politician in Queensland, Australia. He was a Member of the Queensland Legislative Assembly.

Early life
The son of Hugh Campbell and Helen (née Fraser), Campbell was born in Newtown Cook's River, New South Wales. He became a butcher and grazier.
With his wife, Sarah Ann Lovell (married 1866, died 1935), Campbell had four sons and seven daughters.

Politics
Campbell was mayor of the Town of Toowoomba in 1882. His brother, Charles Campbell was also the town's mayor in 1886 and a member of the Queensland Legislative Council.

James Campbell represented Aubigny in the Queensland Legislative Assembly from 4 March 1884 to 29 April 1893.

Later life

Campbell died 13 September 1925 and was buried in Toowong Cemetery.

References

1838 births
1925 deaths
Members of the Queensland Legislative Assembly
Mayors of Toowoomba
Burials at Toowong Cemetery